The 1974 Dwars door België was the 29th edition of the Dwars door Vlaanderen cycle race and was held on 24 March 1974. The race started and finished in Waregem. The race was won by Louis Verreydt.

General classification

References

1974
1974 in road cycling
1974 in Belgian sport